Erik Haghjoo (born December 30, 1976) is a Swedish-American floorball player who plays as a forward. He has won seven caps for the United States national floorball team.  He is currently signed with the Fresno Force of the North American Floorball League.

Career statistics

International

References 

1976 births
Living people
Floorball players
American floorball players
Swedish floorball players